Les Fleurs is a studio album by Ramsey Lewis released in 1983 on Columbia Records. The album peaked at No. 10 on the Billboard Jazz Albums chart and No. 32 on the Billboard Traditional Jazz Albums chart.

Covers
Lewis covered Stevie Wonder's "Superwoman (Where Were You When I Needed You)", "A House Is Not a Home" by Brook Benton, Olivia Newton-John's "Physical" and "Reasons" by Earth, Wind & Fire on the album.

Track listing

References

1983 albums
Ramsey Lewis albums
Columbia Records albums